Giuseppe Torelli (22 April 1658 – 8 February 1709) was an Italian violist, violinist, teacher, and composer of the middle Baroque era.

Torelli is most remembered for contributing to the development of the instrumental concerto., especially concerti grossi and the solo concerto, for strings and continuo, as well as being the most prolific Baroque composer for trumpets.

Life
Torelli was born in Verona. It is not known with whom he studied violin though it has been speculated that he was a pupil of Leonardo Brugnoli or Bartolomeo Laurenti, but it is certain that he studied composition with Giacomo Antonio Perti. On 27 June 1684, at the age of 26, he became a member of the Accademia Filarmonica as suonatore di violino. He was employed as a viola player at the San Petronio basilica beginning in 1686, where he stayed until 1695. or January 1696. when the orchestra was discontinued because of financial constraints. On 1687 Giuseppe Corsi da Celano played Torelli's music, from Op. 3, in Parma at the Sanctuary of Santa Maria della Steccata. By 1698 he was maestro di concerto at the court of Georg Friedrich II, Margrave of Brandenburg-Ansbach, where he conducted the orchestra for Le pazzie d'amore e dell'interesse, an idea drammatica composed by the maestro di cappella, and the castrato Francesco Antonio Pistocchi, before leaving for Vienna in December 1699. He returned to Bologna sometime before February 1701, when he is listed as a violinist in the newly re-formed cappella musicale at San Petronio, directed by his former composition teacher Perti.

He died at age 50 on 8 February 1709 in Bologna, where his manuscripts are conserved in the San Petronio archives.

Giuseppe's brother, Felice Torelli, was a Bolognese painter of modest reputation, who went on to be a founding member of the Accademia Clementina. The most notable amongst Giuseppe's many pupils was Francesco Manfredini.

Selected works
10 Sonate a 3, with basso continuo, Op. 1 (1686).
12 Concerto da camera, for 2 violins and basso continuo, Op. 2 (1686).
12	Sinfonie, for 2–4 instruments, Op. 3 (1687).
12 Concertino per camera for violin and cello, Op. 4 (1688).
12 Sinfonie a 3 e concerti a 4, Op. 5 (1692).
12 Concerti musicali a quattro, Op. 6 (1698).
12 Concerti grossi con una pastorale per il Santissimo Natale, Op. 8 (1709).
More than 30 concertos for 1 to 4 trumpets, including a Sinfonia à 4, composed after 1702. and unpublished during his lifetime, which is a concerto for four trumpets, with an orchestra requiring a minimum of four oboes, two bassoons, trombone, timpani, four violins, two violas, four cellos, two double basses, and continuo.

Selected recordings
Cantata "Lumi dolenti lumi" on Agitata Delphine Galou, Accademia Bizantina, Ottavio Dantone, Alpha. 2017

References

Sources

Further reading
 Bukofzer, Manfred F. 1947. Music in the Baroque Era: From Monteverdi to Bach. New York: W. W. Norton.
Passadore, Francesco. 2007. Catalogo tematico delle composizioni di Giuseppe Torelli (1658–1709). Padua: Edizioni de I Solisti Veneti

External links

Italian Baroque composers
Italian violinists
1658 births
1709 deaths
Male violinists
Musicians from Bologna
Musicians from Verona
Italian Roman Catholics
Italian male classical composers
17th-century Italian composers
18th-century Italian composers
18th-century Italian male musicians
17th-century male musicians